Illés Spitz (Serbo-Croatian: Ilješ Špic / Иљeш Шпиц, Bulgarian and Macedonian: Илеш Шпиц); (2 February 1902, in Budapest – 1 October 1961, in Skopje) was a Hungarian Jew, an international football player and manager. Spitz is among the few survivors of the Holocaust from Macedonia, after being saved by the Bulgarian authorities.

Playing career 
Illés was part of the Újpest FC first "golden era" helping the club win the Coupe des Nations 1930 and three championships. In 1935 he moved to Switzerland where he played one season in FC St. Gallen and another in FC Zürich. During his playing career he played over 1000 matches and scored over 600 goals.

Spitz also played a total of six matches for the Hungary national football team, having scored three goals.

Managerial career 
After finishing his playing career in Switzerland, Illés moved to Yugoslavia where he had a long managerial career. In 1937 he took charge of HNK Hajduk Split, one of the four dominant clubs of the Yugoslav Championship.  Despite not winning any titles during the period of time he spent there, he is remembered in Split for having formed the generation that will later win the Croatian League in 1941 and end the years of disappointment the club had during the 1930s. In 1939 he moved to Gragjanski Skopje playing back then in the Serbian League from which the top clubs qualified to the final stage of the Yugoslav Championship.

In 1941 with the beginning of the Second World War, the region of Vardarska Banovina where Gragjanski was located, was annexed by Bulgaria, and the club was merged with other city clubs to form Macedonia Skopje.  Illes Spitz remained as main coach and most of the players of Gragjanski became part of the new team, some even becoming Bulgarian internationals.  The club successfully competed in the Bulgarian Championship.  The league was played in a cup system and Spitz managed to take the club to the league final in 1942. In March 1943, Spitz was deported as a Jew, to the Treblinka concentration camp. However, he was rescued by the club's managers Dimitar Chkatrov and Dimitar Gyuzelov. They took immediate actions after his arrest and Spitz was brought down from the train near Surdulica.

At the end of the war, the region returned to Yugoslavia, however the country was no longer a monarchy and the new socialist authorities disbanded a series of clubs and created new ones. Spitz stayed in Skopje until 1946 but by then Belgrade club FK Partizan was recruiting the best players all over the country, and Spitz along with Kiril Simonovski as player, were brought from Skopje. Spitz helped Partizan win two national Championships and three Cups. Afterwards he managed FK Radnički Beograd and took them to the Cup final in 1957. In 1960, he returned to Skopje to coach the new city's top-flight team, FK Vardar, and it was in the dressing room, after a league match, that he suddenly died from a heart attack on 1 October 1961.

Honours 
As player:
 Újpest FC
 Hungarian League: 1929-30, 1930-31
 Coupe des Nations 1930
 Mitropa Cup: 1929

As coach:

 Partizan
 Yugoslav First League: 1946-47, 1948-49
 Yugoslav Cup: 1947, 1952, 1954
 Vardar Skopje
 Yugoslav Cup: 1961

References

External sources 
 Short career story at Nogometni leksikon

1902 births
1961 deaths
Hungarian footballers
Hungary international footballers
Hungarian football managers
Association football forwards
Újpest FC players
FC St. Gallen players
FC Zürich players
Expatriate footballers in Switzerland
Hungarian expatriate sportspeople in Switzerland
Expatriate football managers in Croatia
Hungarian expatriate sportspeople in Yugoslavia
HNK Hajduk Split managers
FK Partizan managers
FK Vardar managers
Expatriate football managers in Yugoslavia
Hungarian Jews
Hungarian expatriates in Bulgaria
Expatriate football managers in Bulgaria
Footballers from Budapest